Luca Calvani (born 7 August 1974) is an Italian actor.

Calvani was born in Prato, Tuscany, Italy. Luca was a model during his teen years, working with  top names in the world of fashion, including Giorgio Armani. Spent his twenties in New York City, where he first studied acting with Ron Stetson then with Susan Batson. Among his American TV roles, the HBO series Sex and the City (2001) where he starred opposite Alan Cumming and Sarah Jessica Parker, and as the villain Dante Grimaldi on CBS TV's daytime drama As the World Turns. In Europe, he worked in theatre, TV and film, among them Ferzan Özpetek's award-winning His Secret Life a.k.a. Le Fate Ignoranti. Calvani is trilingual, he speaks French and English in addition to his native Italian. In 2007 he shot Il Commissario Manara directed by Davide Marengo for the Italian network Raiuno. He co-starred as Enzo Calvini opposite Clive Owen in Tom Tykwer's movie The International and the upcoming Italian TV series Questo è Amore directed by Riccardo Milani opposite Stefania Rocca.

Career

Theatre
Sangue del mio sangue, dir. Maria Luisa Bigai (2007)

Filmography

Film
At the Right Moment, directed by Giorgio Panariello and Gaia Gorrini (2000)
The Ignorant Fairies, directed by Ferzan Özpetek (2001)
Absolutely Fabulous, directed by Gabriel Aghion (2001)
Il diario di Matilde Manzoni, directed by Lino Capolicchio (2002)
Il ronzio delle mosche, directed by Dario D'Ambrosi (2003)
Parallel Passage, directed by Mandi Riggi (2003)
Freezerburn, directed by Melissa Balin (2005)
Sguardi controversi, directed by Corrado Veneziano (2006)
The International, directed by Tom Tykwer (2008)
When in Rome, directed by Mark Steven Johnson (2010)
Men vs. Women (2010)
The Man from U.N.C.L.E., directed by Guy Ritchie (2015)
Shakuntala Devi, Hindi movie directed by Anu Menon (2020); played the role of Javier

Television
Distretto di polizia, directed by Renato De Maria (2000)
Sex and the City - Episode: The Real Me, directed by Michael Patrick King (2001)
As the World Turns, various directors (2001)
Quarto piano scala a destra, directed by Michele Truglia - Luca Calvani (2004)
Carabinieri 4, directed by Raffaele Mertes (2005)
La freccia nera, directed by Fabrizio Costa (2006)
Cotti e mangiati, directed by Franco Bertini (2006)
Un posto al sole (2007)
Il commissario Manara, (miniseries) directed by Davide Marengo (2008)
Effetto Sabato, a talk show on Rai Uno (2008–2009)
The Bold and the Beautiful (2012–2013)

TV appearances
L'isola dei famosi 4 " a.k.a. Italian "Celebrity Survivor' - Winner (2006)

References

External links
Luca Calvani - Official Site
Live Interview video
Luca Calvani - Personal page
 

1974 births
Living people
Italian male film actors
Survivor (franchise) winners
Accademia Nazionale di Arte Drammatica Silvio D'Amico alumni
People from Prato
Italian male television actors
Italian male stage actors
20th-century Italian male actors
21st-century Italian male actors
Winners in the Survivor franchise